Breg pri Golem Brdu is a small settlement south of Golo Brdo in the Municipality of Brda in the Littoral region of Slovenia, on the border with Italy.

Name
The name of the settlement was changed from Breg to Breg pri Golem Brdu in 1955.

References

External links
Breg pri Golem Brdu on Geopedia

Populated places in the Municipality of Brda